Jeffrey Steiner (April 3, 1937, Vienna – November 1, 2008) was the chief executive officer of the Fairchild Corporation, the successor corporation of Fairchild Industries, Inc.

Steiner was born in Vienna, Austria. His family fled to Turkey during World War II, when Hitler's troops invaded Austria. He spoke French, English, Turkish, German, Italian, and Spanish. He became the leading executive of the Fairchild Corporation in 1985. He introduced Michael Milken of Drexel Burnham to many of the European banks which would become buyers of Drexel's junk bonds. In 2006 his compensation from Fairchild was halved, following a shareholder lawsuit alleging overpayment.

Steiner was a leader and contributor among the youth of the Jewish community. The New York Times called him a "globe-trotting takeover artist". The French government honored him for his contributions to the arts, naming him a Chevalier des Arts et des Lettres.

He died in November 2008 of cancer, and was survived by five children (Eric, Natalia, Benjamin, Alexandra and Tama Tama, by two different wives) and six grandchildren. They live in Europe (France) and the United States.

References

Austrian chief executives
American chief executives
Austrian Jews
American people of Austrian-Jewish descent
Businesspeople from Vienna
Deaths from cancer
1937 births
2008 deaths
Drexel Burnham Lambert